Jim McNaughton (born January 14, 1942) was a Canadian football player who played for the BC Lions and Saskatchewan Roughriders. He won the Grey Cup with the Lions in 1964. He played college football at the Utah State University.

References

1942 births
People from Vernal, Utah
Utah State Aggies football players
Saskatchewan Roughriders players
BC Lions players
American players of Canadian football
Players of American football from Utah
Living people